Sandviks IK is a Swedish sports club located in Holmsund.

Background
The club was formed on 7 July 1905 and is currently active in the sports of  football, handball, swimming, modern pentathlon, running and cross country.  Past activities that can be traced in the club's history include triathlon, gymnastics, bandy, wrestling, hockey, table tennis, cycling, walking, boxing and figure skating.

Since their foundation Sandviks IK has participated mainly in the middle and lower divisions of the Swedish football league system.  The club currently plays in Division 2 Norrland which is the fourth tier of Swedish football. They play their home matches at the Sandviks IP in Holmsund.

Sandviks IK are affiliated to Västerbottens Fotbollförbund.  The club was runner-up in the Norrländska Mästerskapet in 1937.

Season to season

Footnotes

External links
 Sandviks IK – Official website

Football clubs in Västerbotten County
Defunct bandy clubs in Sweden
Association football clubs established in 1905
Bandy clubs established in 1905
1905 establishments in Sweden